Austroliotia is a genus of sea snails, marine gastropod mollusks in the family Liotiidae.

Description

Distribution
They can be found under stones in the intertidal zone of the temperate coastal waters of Australia and Tasmania.

Species
According to the Indo-Pacific Molluscan Database, the genus Austroliotia consists of the following species with names in current use
 Austroliotia australis (Kiener, 1839)
 Austroliotia botanica (Hedley, 1915)
 Austroliotia darwinensis (Laseron, 1958)
 Austroliotia densilineata (Tate, 1899)
 Austroliotia pulcherrima (Reeve, 1843)
 Austroliotia scalaris (Hedley, 1903)
Species brought into synonymy
 Austroliotia saxa (Laseron, 1954): synonym of Austroliotia scalaris (Hedley, 1903)

References

 Wilson, B., 1993. Australian Marine Shells. Prosobranch Gastropods Pt I. Odyssey Publishing, Leederville, W.A

 
Liotiidae